The Ecuadorian national under-17 football team represents Ecuador in international under-17 football competitions and is controlled by the Ecuadorian Football Federation.

Competitive record

FIFA U-17 World Cup

South American Under-17 Football Championship

*Draws include knockout matches decided on penalty kicks.

Current squad
The following players were selected to take part in the South American Under-20 Football Championship.

See also
 Ecuador national football team
 Ecuador national under-20 football team

References

South American national under-17 association football teams
Under-17